This is a list of Romanian brands:

 Poiana (chocolate)
 Carpați (cigarette)
 Polidin, an immunomodulator vaccine
 Cantastim, a drug used to stimulate the immune system 
 Faringosept, pills for neck pains 
 Automobile Dacia (car)
 Ursus (beer)
 Timisoareana (beer)
 Banca Comercială Română
 Ciuc (beer) a brand based in Miercurea Ciuc
 eMag (electrocics, elecrocasnics, toys shop )
 Dedeman (hypermarket chain)
 Petrom (oil and gas producer) controlled by Austrian's OMV
 Digi Communications (internet and TV company) (RCS & RDS)
 Banca Transilvania (financial services)
 BRD – Groupe Société Générale
 Altex (electrocics, elecrocasnics, toys shop )
 Catena (pharmacy)
 TVR (TV network)
 Căile Ferate Române (national railway services)

References 

 
Romanian brands
Brands